The 2015–16 Elitserien was the ninth season of the present highest Swedish men's bandy top division, Elitserien. The regular season began on 23 October 2015, and the final was played at Tele2 Arena in Stockholm on 19 March 2016. Västerås SK won the Swedish national championship title by defeating Villa Lidköping BK, 5-2, in the final game.

Summary
The league started on 23 October 2015.

Teams

League table

Knock-out stage

Final

Relegation play-offs

Group A

Group B

Season statistics

Top scorers

References

Elitserien (bandy) seasons
Bandy
Bandy
Elitserien
Elitserien